Turgut Özal (1927–1993) was a Turkish politician who served as the 8th President of Turkey from 1989 to 1993. He previously served as the 26th Prime Minister of Turkey from 1983 to 1989 as the leader of the Motherland Party.

It may also refer to:

Turgut Özal (Istanbul Metro), Turkey
Malatya Turgut Özal University, Malatya, Turkey
Turgut Özal University, Ankara, Turkey
Turgut Özal Medical Center at İnönü University, Turkey

See also
Özal family
Özal, disambiguation